The Șimișna is a left tributary of the river Someș in Romania. It discharges into the Someș near Rus.

References

Rivers of Romania
Rivers of Sălaj County
Rivers of Cluj County